The PSA World Series 2015 is a series of men's and women's squash tournaments which are part of the Professional Squash Association (PSA) World Tour for the start of 2015 squash season. The PSA World Series tournaments are some of the most prestigious events on the men's and women's tour.

PSA World Series Ranking Points
PSA World Series events also have a separate World Series ranking.  Points for this are calculated on a cumulative basis after each World Series event. The top eight players at the end of the calendar year are then eligible to play in the PSA World Series Finals.

2015 Men's PSA World Series

2015 Men's Tournaments

Men's World Series Standings 2015

2015 Women's PSA World Series

2015 Women's Tournaments

Women's World Series Standings 2015

See also
PSA World Tour 2015
Official Men's Squash World Ranking
Official Women's Squash World Ranking

References

External links 
 World Series Series Squash website 

PSA World Tour seasons
2015 in squash